WCHY (97.7 FM) is a radio station licensed to Cheboygan, Michigan, United States. The station airs a format consisting of local talk shows and oldies and is currently owned by Michigan Broadcasters LLC. The station previously aired a country music format branded as "Straits Country", which originated on WWSS 95.3 FM in Tuscarora Township and moved to WCHY on March 12, 2018.

References

External links

CHY
Oldies radio stations in the United States